The Festival Album is a live album by The Jazz Crusaders recorded in 1966 at Newport Jazz Festival in Rhode Island and Pacific Jazz Festival in California. It was released on the Pacific Jazz label that same year.

Reception

AllMusic rated the album with 3½ stars noting: "The Festival Album was the only live set by the Jazz Crusaders not recorded at the Lighthouse. As such, it is a compilation of performances recorded at the Pacific Jazz and Newport Festivals in 1966".

Track listing 
 "Introduction - 0:34
 "Trance Dance" (Kenny Cox) - 9:28
 "Summer's Madness" (Joe Sample, Wayne Henderson, Wilton Felder) - 10:06
 "Young Rabbits" (Henderson) - 7:49
 "Freedom Sound" (Sample) - 7:59
 "Wilton's Boogaloo" (Felder) - 11:35 Bonus track on CD reissue
 "Half and Half" (Charles Davis) - 9:14 Bonus track on CD reissue
Recorded at the Newport Jazz Festival in Newport, RI on July 4, 1966 (tracks 4 & 5), at the Pacific Jazz Festival in Costa Mesa, CA on October 8, 1966 (tracks 1-3) and at Shelly's Manne-Hole in Hollywood, CA on July 19, 1968 (tracks 6 & 7)

Personnel 
Wayne Henderson - trombone
Wilton Felder - tenor saxophone
Joe Sample - piano
Jimmy Bond (tracks 1-3), Herbie Lewis (tracks 4 & 5), Buster Williams (tracks 6 & 7) - bass
Stix Hooper - drums

References 

The Jazz Crusaders live albums
1966 live albums
Pacific Jazz Records live albums
Albums recorded at the Newport Jazz Festival
Albums recorded at Shelly's Manne-Hole